This is a list of recording artists who have reached number one on the singles chart in Czech Republic, published by Rádio Top 100 Oficiální since 30 December 2002.

All acts are listed alphabetically.
Solo artists are alphabetized by last name, Groups by group name excluding "A", "An", and "The".
Each act's total of number-one singles is shown after their name.
All artists who are mentioned in song credits are listed here; this includes one-time pairings of otherwise solo artists and those appearing as featured. Members of a group who reached number one are excluded, unless they hit number one as a solo artist.

A

A7S (2)
Adele (5)
Christina Aguilera (1)
Akon (2)
Lily Allen (1)
Anastacia (1)
DJ Antoine (1)
Arash (1)
James Arthur (1)
ATB (1)
Atomic Kitten (1)
Avicii (5)
Axwell (1)

B

B.o.B. (1)
Backstreet Boys (1)
Shaun Baker (1)
Dan Bárta (1)
Natasha Bedingfield (1)
Alec Benjamin (1)
Justin Bieber (2)
Lucie Bílá (1)
Aloe Blacc (1)
Fito Blanko (1)
The Black Eyed Peas (5)
James Blunt (2)
Bruno Mars (2)
DJ Bobo (1)
 Bonn (1)

C

Camila Cabello (1)
Calvin Harris (1)
Lewis Capaldi (3)
Dan Caplen (1)
Alessia Cara (1)
 James Carter (1)
The Chainsmokers (1)
Charli XCX (1)
Clean Bandit (1)
Colbie Caillat (1)
Coldplay (4)
JP Cooper (1)
Joel Corry (1)
Chinaski (13)
Miley Cyrus (3)

D

Ray Dalton (1)
DCUP (1)
Dido (1)
Celine Dion (1)
Divokej Bill (1)
Alesha Dixon (1)
Dizzee Rascal (1)
Dragonette (1)
Emma Drobna (1)
Duck Sauce (1)
Elley Duhé (1)

E

Eamon (1)
Mikky Ekko (1)
Ellie Goulding (1)
George Ezra (2)

F

Alle Farben (2)
Ewa Farna (1)
 Fast Boy (1)
Faul & Wad Ad (1)
Fergie (1)
Flipsyde (1)
Flo Rida (1)
Luis Fonsi (1)
Freshlyground (1)
Nelly Furtado (2)

G

Galantis (1)
Martin Garrix (1)
Get Far (1)
Global Deejays (1)
Jess Glynne (2)
Ellie Goulding (2)
Karel Gott (1)
Gotye (1)
Green Day (3)
David Guetta (4)
Guru Josh Project (1)

H

Halsey (1)
Calvin Harris (2)
Alex Hepburn (1)
Becky Hill (1)
 Michal Hrůza (1)
Hozier (1)

I
Ilira (1)
Imagine Dragons (2)
Enrique Iglesias (4)
Sebastian Ingrosso (1)

J

Frankie J (1)
Jack & Jack (1)
Felix Jaehn (2)
Jamelia (1)
Jay-Z (1)
Vika Jigulina (1)
Elton John (1)
Jonas Blue (1)
Jonas Brothers (2)
Mikolas Josef (1)
Juanes (1)

K

Kaiser Chiefs (1)
Katarína Knechtová (1)
Dermot Kennedy (1)
Khaled (1)
Khalid (1)
 Kiddo (1)
Elle King (1)
Klingande (1)
Tomáš Klus (1)
Lenny Kravitz (1)
Alicia Keys (1)
Kimbra (1)
Kodaline (1)
Kryštof (11)
Kygo (2)

L

Lady Gaga (3)
Aneta Langerová (1)
Lenka (1)
Lenny (2)
Dua Lipa (2)
Limp Bizkit (1)
LMFAO (1)
Jennifer Lopez (2)
Lost Frequencies (2)
Demi Lovato (1)
LP (2)
Lucenzo (1)
 Lucie (1)
Lukas Graham (1)
Lum!x (1)
Lunchmoney Lewis (1)

M

Amy Macdonald (1)
Macklemore (1)
Madcon (1)
Madonna (1)
 Mandrage (2)
Maroon 5 (1)
Marshmello (2)
Marquess (1)
 Sima Martausová (1)
Sam Martin (1)
Edward Maya (1)
Ava Max (3)
Meduza (1)
Shawn Mendes (3)
 Mig 21 (1)
Miguel (1)
Mika (1)
Milk & Sugar (1)
Milky Chance (1)
Minelli (1)
  (4)
MNEK (1)
Morandi (2)
Mr Probz (1)

N

Naughty Boy (1)
Václav Neckář (1)
 Nightwork (1)
No Doubt (1)

O

Oceana (1)
Ofenbach (2)
Don Omar (1)
OMI (1)
OneRepublic (1)
Rita Ora (1)
Outkast (1)

P

Passenger (1)
Liam Payne (1)
PEHA (1)
Katy Perry (4)
 Peter Bič Project (1)
Pink (8)
The Pirates (1)
Pitbull (3)
Plain White T's (1)
Pnau (1)
Gabry Ponte (1)
Mike Posner (1)
Daniel Powter (1)
Prezioso (1)
PSY (1)
The Pussycat Dolls (1)

R

R3hab (1)
Carly Rae Jepsen (1)
 Ready Kirken (1)
Rag'n'Bone Man (2)
Regard (1)
Rihanna (3)
Mark Ronson (1)
Marlon Roudette (1)
Kelly Rowland (1)
Rudimental (1)
Nate Ruess (1)
Rytmus (1)

S

Astrid S (1)
Nico Santos (1)
Safri Duo (1)
Robin Schulz (2)
September (1)
Shakira (3)
Sheppard (1)
Ed Sheeran (6)
Sia (2)
Matt Simons (1)
Bob Sinclair (1)
 Erika Sirola (1)
Sam Smith (1)
Snow (1)
Martin Solveig (1)
Álvaro Soler (3)
JC Stewart (1)
Stromae (1)
Harry Styles (1)
Sugababes (2)
Support Lesbiens (2)
Taylor Swift (1)

T

Michel Teló (1)
Jasmine Thompson (1)
Justin Timberlake (1)
Timbaland (1)
 Tina (1)
Tiësto (1)
Tones and I (1)
Topic (2)
Twenty One Pilots (1)

U

 Umakart (1)

V

Vaya Con Dios (1)
Velile (1)
Verona (2)

W

 Wanastowi Vjecy (1)
Alan Walker (3)
Nick Waterhouse (1)
The Weeknd (2)
Welshly Arms (1)
Westlife (1)
Hayley Williams (1)
Robbie Williams (1)
Pharrell Williams (1)
Wisin (1)

X

Xindl X (4)

Y

Daddy Yankee (1)
Yolanda Be Cool (1)
Younotus (1)

Z
 David Žbirka (1)
Miro Žbirka (1)
Helena Zeťová (1)
Zonderling (1)
 Marek Ztracený (1)

External links
Rádio Top 100 Oficiální

 
Czech Republic